Haval is an automotive marque owned by the Chinese automaker Great Wall Motors that specialises in crossovers and SUVs.
It was launched in March 2013.

History
Haval is a specialist manufacturer of SUVs owned by Great Wall Motors. The Haval brand has been marketed in Australia, Argentina, Bangladesh, Bulgaria, New Zealand, Russia, South Africa, Benin, Tunisia, Côte d'Ivoire, Chile, Paraguay, Ecuador, Egypt, Guatemala, Bolivia, Peru, Malaysia, Brunei, Saudi Arabia, Zimbabwe, UAE, Pakistan, USA, Iraq, Iran and other countries.

Products

Current 
 Haval H6 (2011–present)
 Haval H9 (2014–present)
 Haval M6/M6 Plus (2017–present)
 Haval F7/F7x (2018–present)
 Haval Big Dog (大狗 Dagou) (2020–present)
 Haval Jolion (初恋 First Love) (2020–present)
 Haval Chitu (赤兔 Red Hare) (2021–present)
 Haval Shenshou (2021–present)
 Haval Cool Dog (2022–present)
 Haval Xiaolong Max (2023–present)

Upcoming 
 Haval Xiaolong / A07 DHT
 Haval B07 DHT
 HAVAL P04

Discontinued 
 Haval H5 (2010–2020)
 Haval H8 (2013–2018)
 Haval M4/H1 (2013–2021)
 Haval H2 (2014–2021)
 Haval H2s (2016–2019)
 Haval H4 (2017–2020)
 Haval F5 (2018–2020)
 Haval H6 Coupe (2015–2021)
 Haval H7 (2015–2021)

Sales

References

External links
 Official site

Vehicle manufacturing companies established in 2013
Great Wall Motors
Cars of China
Chinese brands